The Action and Renewal Movement (MAR) is a political party in the Republic of the Congo. It was founded by Jean-Baptiste Tati Loutard, who was the party's president until his death in 2009. He was succeeded by incumbent leader Roland Bouiti-Viaudo, who formerly served as Mayor of Pointe-Noire and Minister of State for Hydrocarbons. The party supports the presidency of Denis Sassou Nguesso.

MAR held its constitutive congress in late December 2006, marking its transformation into a political party; 342 delegates attended the congress. In the parliamentary election held on 24 June and 5 August 2007, the party won five out of 137 seats. The party has been since part of Denis Sassou Nguesso's governing coalition.

Electoral history

National Assembly elections

References

External links 
 

Political parties in the Republic of the Congo